Carsten Mogensen (born 24 July 1983) is a former badminton player from Denmark. He was the gold medalist at the 2015 European Games, two time European champions winning in 2012 and 2017, and the silver medalist at the 2012 Summer Olympics. Mogensen was a former world number 1 in the BWF World ranking together with Mathias Boe.

Early life 
Mogensen was born in Roskilde, a city on the island of Zealand and is currently living in nearby Greve.

Career 
He won the silver medal at the 2006 European Badminton Championships in men's doubles, with Mathias Boe. Two years later he won the bronze medal at the 2008 European Badminton Championships in mixed doubles with Helle Nielsen. In 2010, Mogensen and Boe won the titles at the Denmark Super Series, French Super Series and the Super Series Final held in Taipei. One year later Mogensen and Boe won the All England Super Series. After that they won the Li Ning China Open 2011 and the Li Ning BWF World Superseries Finals 2011. In 2012, Mogensen and Boe won the silver medal in men's doubles at the Olympics in London. He also took the silver medal at the 2013 BWF World Championships.
In 2014 Li-Ning BWF World Championships he and Boe was defeated by the world number 1 Lee Yong Dae/Yoo Yeon Seong from Korea in two straight game at the semifinals, then he and Boe just taken the bronze medal in that world championships. In March 2015, Mogensen and Boe again won the All England Super Series.

While in Kazan with the national team at the 2016 European Men's Team Championship, Mogensen suffered an intracranial aneurysm and had to undergo brain surgery.

Achievements

Olympic Games 
Men's doubles

BWF World Championships 
Men's doubles

European Games 
Men's doubles

European Championships 
Men's doubles

Mixed doubles

European Junior Championships 
Boys' doubles

Mixed doubles

BWF World Tour 
The BWF World Tour, announced on 19 March 2017 and implemented in 2018, is a series of elite badminton tournaments, sanctioned by Badminton World Federation (BWF). The BWF World Tour are divided into six levels, namely World Tour Finals, Super 1000, Super 750, Super 500, Super 300 (part of the HSBC World Tour), and the BWF Tour Super 100.

Men's doubles

BWF Superseries 
The BWF Superseries, launched on 14 December 2006 and implemented in 2007, is a series of elite badminton tournaments, sanctioned by Badminton World Federation (BWF). BWF Superseries has two levels: Superseries and Superseries Premier. A season of Superseries features twelve tournaments around the world, which introduced since 2011, with successful players invited to the Superseries Finals held at the year end.

Men's doubles

  BWF Superseries Finals tournament
  BWF Superseries Premier tournament
  BWF Superseries tournament

BWF Grand Prix 

The BWF Grand Prix has two levels, Grand Prix and Grand Prix Gold. It is a series of badminton tournaments sanctioned by the Badminton World Federation (BWF) since 2007. The World Badminton Grand Prix sanctioned by International Badminton Federation (IBF) since 1983.

Men's doubles

Mixed doubles

  BWF Grand Prix Gold tournament
  BWF & IBF Grand Prix tournament

BWF International Challenge/Series/European Circuit 
Men's doubles

Mixed doubles

  BWF International Challenge tournament
  BWF International Series / European Circuit tournament

References

External links 
 
  (With Boe)
 
 
 Carsten Mogensen at BadmintonEurope.com
 
 Carsten Mogensen at Badminton.dk

Living people
1983 births
People from Roskilde
Danish male badminton players
Badminton players at the 2012 Summer Olympics
Badminton players at the 2016 Summer Olympics
Olympic badminton players of Denmark
Olympic silver medalists for Denmark
Olympic medalists in badminton
Medalists at the 2012 Summer Olympics
Badminton players at the 2015 European Games
European Games gold medalists for Denmark
European Games medalists in badminton
World No. 1 badminton players
Sportspeople from Region Zealand